Gillian Gilks  (formerly Gillian Perrin, and later Gillian Goodwin; born 20 June 1950) is an English former badminton player who won numerous major titles in all three events (singles, doubles, and mixed doubles) between the late 1960s and the mid-1980s.

Tall and slender in her badminton prime, with elegant, accurate strokes, Gilks is the most successful player ever in the European Badminton Championships with 12 titles, two of them in women's singles, four in women's doubles and six in mixed doubles. She is also one of the most successful players in the long history of the All England Open Championships with eleven titles; two in women's singles, three in women's doubles, and six in mixed doubles. In 1976 she won all three events at the All Englands making her the last person to "sweep the board" there in a single year. She also won a Gold and bronze medal at the 1972 Olympics when badminton was played as a demonstration sport. In 1999 she was inducted into the World Badminton Hall of Fame.

Achievements

Olympic Games (demonstration)

World Championships

World Cup

World Games

Commonwealth Games

European Championships

IBF World Grand Prix 
The World Badminton Grand Prix sanctioned by International Badminton Federation (IBF) from 1983 to 2006.

International tournaments

IBF International

References

External links
 
 
 
 
 
 
 

1950 births
Living people
English female badminton players
Members of the Order of the British Empire
Olympic badminton players of Great Britain
Badminton players at the 1972 Summer Olympics
Commonwealth Games gold medallists for England
Commonwealth Games silver medallists for England
Commonwealth Games medallists in badminton
Badminton players at the 1970 British Commonwealth Games
Badminton players at the 1974 British Commonwealth Games
World Games medalists in badminton
World Games gold medalists
Competitors at the 1981 World Games
Medallists at the 1970 British Commonwealth Games
Medallists at the 1974 British Commonwealth Games